The 2002 Basque Pelota World Championships were the 14th edition of the Basque Pelota World Championships organized by  the FIPV.

Participating nations

Events
A total of 14 events were disputed, in 4 playing areas.

Trinquete, 6 events disputed

Fronton (30 m), 3 events disputed

Fronton (36 m), 4 events disputed

Fronton (54 m), 1 event disputed

Medal table

References

World Championships,2002
2002 in sports
Sport in Pamplona
International sports competitions hosted by Spain
2002 in Spanish sport
World Championships,2002
World Championships